To/Die/For (often abbreviated TDF) are a gothic metal band from the town of Kouvola in southeast of Finland, originally assembled in 1993 as a hard rock band under the name Mary-Ann. In 1999, they decided to change their musical style to gothic metal, changing their band name as well. The band disbanded in April 2009, but reformed in July 2009, and played their final concert at John Smith Festival in Finland on 22 June 2016. They reformed once again in early 2020.

History

Mary-Ann (1993–1999) 

To/Die/For was formed under the name Mary-Ann in 1993. They released two demo EPs, "Mary-Ann" in 1997 and "Deeper Sin" in 1998, before changing name as they modified musical style from heavy metal to gothic metal in 1999. "Deeper Sin" thereby resulted in a record deal with Spinefarm Records.

All Eternity and Epilogue (1999–2002) 
Their debut album – All Eternity – was released in Finland by the end of 1999, and the band then signed contracts with Nuclear Blast (for Europe) and Pony Canyon (for Japan). Their cover of the Sandra song "In the Heat of the Night" was to be the only single, and together with "Farewell" it was recorded as a music video, and obtained a fair amount of exposure.

In 2000, the band toured Europe together with Dark Tranquillity, Sentenced and In Flames. Bassist Miikka Kuisma quit the band and was replaced by Marko Kangaskolkka, who had played with the band in its early years. "Epilogue", the successor of "All Eternity", was released in 2001, and was followed by a tour with Lacrimosa.

Jaded, IV and Wounds Wide Open (2003–2009) 
The album Jaded was released in 2003, and is by many fans still seen as the band's best effort. In August of that year, vocalist Jarno Perätalo left the band. He assembled a new band named Tiaga, integrated by former members of To/Die/For. Juha Kylmänen (from For My Pain and Reflexion) then assumed the vocals of To/Die/For. However, in 2004, Jarno Perätalo and the band Tiaga took the name To/Die/For themselves, releasing the fourth album, simply titled IV, in 2005.

On 4 October 2006, To/Die/For released their fifth studio album, Wounds Wide Open. After the promotional tour that stretched to October 2007, the band decided to take a break.

Samsara, Cult, deaths, split-up and reformation (2009–2016, 2019–present) 
To/Die/For released their sixth album Samsara in 2011, and after spending the following years touring, released their seventh studio album Cult in May 2015. The first single from their album, "Screaming Birds", was released in November 2014. To/Die/For disbanded in July 2016.

Two of the band's former drummers died; Tommi Lillman died on 13 February 2012 after an illness, and Santtu Lonka died on 26 January 2020 with no cause of death revealed (probably suicide).

In January 2020, the band announced they would be reuniting to play at the John Smith Festival at Laukaa in July 2020.

Line-up 
Line-up in the "Mary-Ann" era is not included.

Current members 
 Jape Perätalo – vocals, keyboards (1999–2016, 2020–present)
 Juppe Sutela – rhythm guitar (1999–2005, 2010–2016, 2020–present)
 Joonas Koto – lead guitar (1999–2002, 2005–2009, 2020–present)
 Matti Huopainen – drums (2011–2016, 2020–present)
 Miikka Kuisma – bass (1999–2000, 2020–present)

Former members 
 Tonmi Lillman – drums, keyboards (1999–2003, 2009–2010; died 2012)
 Marko Kangaskolkka – bass (2001–2004)
 Mika Ahtiainen – lead guitar (2002–2005)
 Josey Strandman – bass (2004–2011)
 Santtu Lonka – drums (2003–2008, 2010–2011; died 2020)
 Antti-Matti "Antza" Talala – lead guitar (2005–2014)
 Jussi-Mikko Salminen – keyboards (2004–2005, 2010–2014)
 Toni Paananen – drums (2008–2009)
 Samuel Schildt – bass (2014–2015)
 Eza Viren – bass (2011–2014), lead guitar, keyboards (2014–2016)

Guest musicians 
 Alexi Laiho – guitar solo on In the Heat of the Night
 Kimberly Goss – vocals in All Eternity
 Marko Hietala – vocals in Epilogue
 Tanya Kemppainen – vocals in Epilogue and Jaded
 Anna Lukkarinen – vocals in Jaded
 Jonna Imelainen – vocals in Jaded

Timeline

Discography

Demos & EPs (as Mary-Ann) 
 Mary-ann (demo album, 1997)
 Deeper Sin (demo EP, 1998)

Albums 
 All Eternity (1999)
 Epilogue (2001)
 Jaded (2003)
 IV (2005)
 Wounds Wide Open (2006)
 Samsara (2011)
 Cult (2015)

Compilations 
Epilogue from the Past (2010)

Singles 
 In the Heat of the Night (2000)
 Hollow Heart (2001)
 Little Deaths (2005)
 Like Never Before (2006)
 Screaming Birds (2014)

References

External links 
 Official website
 To/Die/For Facebook

Finnish gothic metal musical groups
Finnish heavy metal musical groups
Musical groups established in 1993
Musical groups reestablished in 2020
Musical groups disestablished in 2016
Musical quintets
Nuclear Blast artists